Bender was an American hard rock band from Milwaukee, Wisconsin.

Bender had a local reach for some time before being signed onto TVT Records. The band has produced two albums, the first called Joe released in 1995, and later an album called Jehovah's Hitlist released in 1998 independently and later remastered and re-released on TVT Records in 2000. In 2005, a source close to the band stated that Bender would remain "inactive until further notice."

Their more popular songs, "Isolate" and "Superfly", were featured on the game ATV Offroad Fury for PlayStation 2. The song "Angel Dust" also appeared in the movie 3000 Miles to Graceland starring Kevin Costner and Kurt Russell.

Discography

Studio albums

Singles

Personnel
Kent Boyce – lead vocals
Matt Scerpella – guitar
Tim Cook – bass, backing vocals
Steve Adams – drums

TVT Records artists
Musical groups from Wisconsin
American nu metal musical groups